Inzhich-Chukun is a rural locality (an aul) and the administrative center of Abazinsky District in the Karachay-Cherkess Republic, Russia, located on the banks of the Maly Zelenchuk River. Population:  mostly Abazins.

It was founded by Russians in 1861. In 1925, its original name Zelenchuksko-Loovsky was changed to Inzhich-Chukun, the Russified local name of Maly Zelenchuk, as a part of a campaign to remove the names of nobility (Loovsky in this case) from the toponyms.

Inzhich-Chukun was a part of Khabezsky District prior to creation of Abazinsky District in 2006.

References

Rural localities in Karachay-Cherkessia